Esther Denise "Woj" Hochman Wojcicki (born May 26, 1941) is an American journalist, educator, and vice chair of the Creative Commons advisory council. Wojcicki has studied education and technology. She is the founder of the Palo Alto High School Media Arts Program in Palo Alto, CA., and the Co-Founder of TractLearning, Inc that publishes the website Tract.app a peer to peer, project-based, gamified learning platform for kids 8 years and over.

Early life and education

Wojcicki is the oldest of three children and was the first in her family to attend college. Her parents were Russian Jewish immigrants who came to New York City in the 1930s. Her family moved to Southern California after she was born. Wojcicki was valedictorian of her high school class and attended the University of California, Berkeley, graduating with a B.A. in English and political science. She also received a secondary teaching credential and a master's degree in journalism from Berkeley. She has an M.A. in French and French history from the Sorbonne as well as both a secondary school administrative credential and a M.A. in educational technology from San Jose State University.

Career
Wojcicki taught journalism and English at Palo Alto High School from 1984 to 2020. There she began a journalism program which has become one of the largest in America. She has also worked as a professional journalist for multiple publications and blogs regularly for The Huffington Post.

Wojcicki was the 1990 Northern California Journalism Teacher of the Year and was selected as the California Teacher of the Year in 2002 by the California Commission on Teacher Credentialing. 

She served on the University of California Office of the President Curriculum Committee where she helped revise the beginning and advanced journalism curriculum for the state of California. In 2009, she was awarded the Gold Key by Columbia Scholastic Press Association in recognition of outstanding devotion to the cause of the school press. Wojcicki is also on the Board of Trustees of the "Developmental Studies Center" and on the Board of Governors of the "Alliance for Excellent Education". 

She serves as Chairman of the Board of "Learning Matters" and is part of the Advisory Board at the THNK School of Creative Leadership. She is Chief Learning Officer for Explore Planet3, an exploration based science platform for middle school students. Wolenski is on the board of the Newseum in Washington, D.C and the Freedom Forum. She holds an honorary doctorate from Palo Alto University (2013) and from Rhode Island School of Design (2016). 

Wojcicki founded the Journalistic Learning Initiative at the University of Oregon School of Communications and School of Education (2016) www.journalisticlearning.com. She is also the founder of the Moonshots in Education Movement (MiE) that can be found at www.Moonshots.org.(2017). In 2019 she authored a book titled How to Raise Successful People, a parenting book on the philosophy she used in raising her three illustrate daughters. Wojcicki has discussed her life and the book on BBC Radio 4's Woman's Hour in May 2019. She publishes a newsletter called "Woj's World News."

A highlight of her experience at Palo Alto High School was mentoring Steve Jobs' daughter, Lisa Brennan-Jobs.

Personal life
Her husband is Stanford University professor of physics Stanley Wojcicki. They have three daughters: Susan (former CEO of YouTube), Janet, a Fulbright-winning anthropologist, Assistant Professor of Pediatrics and researcher, and Anne (co-founder of 23andMe), and ten grandchildren.

Works 
 How to raise successful people : simple lessons for radical results, London : Hutchinson, 2019. , 
 Moonshots in Education: Launching Blended Learning in the Classroom, Pacific Research Institute, San Francisco, 2015

References

External links

Esther Wojcicki's blog at The Huffington Post
ClassWish.org

American people of Russian-Jewish descent
Schoolteachers from California
American women educators
American women journalists
Jewish American journalists
Journalists from California
Living people
Members of the Creative Commons board of directors
People from Palo Alto, California
San Jose State University alumni
UC Berkeley Graduate School of Journalism alumni
UC Berkeley College of Engineering alumni
University of Paris alumni
1940 births
21st-century American women